Daglish, Western Australia is a suburb of Perth. The first portion that developed was the area bounded by Stubbs Terrace, Cunningham Terrace, Millington Avenue, Troy Terrace and Robinson Terrace. The streets in this area were named , and most were named after Western Australian politicians or personnel at the Municipality of Subiaco. The second area to develop was the south-western corner of Daglish. Those streets were named , and were named after Subiaco Municipal Council North Ward councillors at the time. The final area to develop was the north-western corner of the suburb, which was developed in the 1970s. Those street names were in use by the 1960s, but were only officially approved on 11 July 1986. Those streets were named after prominent people from the University of Western Australia (UWA), as that land was previously UWA endowment land.

List

See also
List of streets in Kardinya, Western Australia – another Perth suburb that was previously UWA endowment land

References

Daglish
Daglish, Western Australia
Daglish streets